"The Stranger" is a song by rock artist Billy Joel and the title track from his 1977 album of the same name. The song was released as a single in Japan where it became very popular and peaked at #2 on the Oricon chart, selling more than 471,000 copies, charting as well in Australia, New Zealand and France. It was the last single from the album in Japan, while the US and UK saw "She's Always a Woman", released the previous year, as the last single from the album. The single is featured on Joel's greatest hits album, Greatest Hits - Volume I & II.

In 2020, the song was featured during the ending credits of the 2020 miniseries The Stand.

Background
The song begins and ends with a quiet melody, played on piano and whistled by Joel with accompaniment from his band. He had originally wanted it to be played by some kind of wind instrument, but after he whistled it as a demonstration, producer Phil Ramone persuaded him to abandon the idea and whistle the melody himself for the final cut. It was Joel's homage to Carl Jung's definition of the psychology archetype known as "The Shadow".

An untitled two-minute instrumental "hidden track" reprise of this song is featured at the end of The Stranger, after "Everybody Has a Dream".

"The Stranger" has been sampled frequently, primarily in the hip hop genre, in songs such as "Tha Shiznit" by Snoop Dogg.

Track listing

7" vinyl (CBS)
 "The Stranger"
 "Just the Way You Are"

Japanese 7" vinyl
 "The Stranger" [4:10]
 "Movin' Out (Anthony's Song)" [3:30]

Chart history

References

External links
 

1977 songs
1978 singles
Billy Joel songs
CBS Records singles
Columbia Records singles
Song recordings produced by Phil Ramone
Songs written by Billy Joel